In the film industry, a bankable star is an actor (movie star) "capable of guaranteeing box-office success simply by showing up in a movie." The bankability of an actor includes their films' box office track record, professional demeanor, and other factors. Hiring a bankable star helps a film company to secure investment, distribution, and garner media attention. Some bankable stars have so much star power that even films without a strong concept or "hook"―such as star vehicle films―are feasible to make.

A bankable director is a similar notion.

Overview 

Media consultant Blake Harris states that a bankable star is one of the "3 minimum ingredients to any film package," the other two being a successful director and a script or a strong story idea. The involvement of a bankable star in a film gives investors confidence that they will achieve a return on their investments by ensuring that the film is widely distributed and that at least some people will pay to see it (that it will "open").

Harris adds that obtaining a bankable star for a package is not easy because of the dearth of such stars. He states that at any point in time there are no more than "a dozen or so" stars whose mere involvement will ensure that a film will be made.

Analyst Alex Epstein states that bankable stars or, more generally, "bankable elements" are how "hookless" films (films without a compelling concept that makes people interested in them in their own right) get made. He gives Dances with Wolves as an example of a movie: the involvement of Kevin Costner as the bankable star guaranteed that the movie was made. Writer Melissa Robbie concurs, stating that some movies are high-concept (they have what Epstein terms "hooks"), but others are simply star vehicles for bankable stars.

The Hollywood Reporter has published several results of polls for Hollywood's top ten most bankable stars, the most recent three being one in 1999, one in 2002 and the last one in 2006.

The 2002 survey polled "114 executives at both major studios and independent companies, financiers and various industry players from around the world." Voters were asked which stars "did the most to attract financing to a film, ensure its global distribution, and deliver that hugely important opening weekend based on the strength of their good name."

James Ulmer has compared his list of bankable stars, The Ulmer Scale, to a stock market index. His criteria for ranking is based on the name of a star alone being able to get people to movie theaters in the United States as well as the rest of the world. In an August 2010 interview Ulmer described the international movie market as "unfortunately ... pretty sexist"; how a woman's name alone cannot sell a movie, and how female stars are only bankable when cast with a male star or in ensemble movies.

Lists of most bankable stars

The Hollywood Reporter 
These are the top 10 lists of the most bankable stars, with their scores, as published by The Hollywood Reporter.

1999 
 Tom Hanks
 Mel Gibson
 Tom Cruise
 Harrison Ford
 Jim Carrey
 Leonardo DiCaprio
 John Travolta
 Julia Roberts
 Robin Williams
 Brad Pitt

2002 
 Tom Cruise (100.00)
 Tom Hanks (100.00)
 Julia Roberts (100.00)
 Mel Gibson (98.68)
 Jim Carrey (98.46)
 George Clooney (95.18)
 Russell Crowe (94.74)
 Harrison Ford (94.74)
 Jodie Foster (94.30)
 Brad Pitt (92.98)

2006 
 Tom Cruise
 Tom Hanks 
 Jim Carrey 
 George Clooney 
 Russell Crowe 
 Johnny Depp 
 Nicole Kidman 
 Jude Law
 Brad Pitt 
 Julia Roberts

Ulmer Scale 
The list was created by veteran entertainment journalist James Ulmer, who developed a 100-point method to quantify a star's value to a film production, in terms of getting a movie financed and the cameras rolling. The Ulmer Scale also takes into account an actor's history (box office successes vs. failures), versatility, professional demeanor, and ability and willingness to travel and promote movies.

2009 
The Top 10 list as of 2009 (in order of 'bankable' value):

Will Smith
Johnny Depp
Brad Pitt
Tom Hanks
George Clooney
Will Ferrell
Reese Witherspoon
Nicolas Cage
Leonardo DiCaprio
Russell Crowe

See also 
A-list
Celebrity
Movie star
Superstar
Four Dan Actresses
Four Heavenly Kings (Hong Kong)

References

External links 
 The Hollywood Reporter's on-line results of its Star Power surveys

Film actors
Celebrity
Cinema of the United States
Film and video terminology